Luis Doreste Blanco (born 7 March 1961 in Las Palmas de Gran Canaria, Las Palmas) is a Spanish sailor who won gold medal both in the 1984 Summer Olympics (470 class), and in the 1992 Summer Olympics in Barcelona (Flying Dutchman).

A member of Real Club Náutico de Gran Canaria, Doreste became World Champion in 1985 (Flying Dutchman), and again in 1995 (Soling). He is three times European Champion, from 1976 (Optimist), 1985 (470) and 1988 (Flying Dutchman). He is a four-time Olympian.

Doreste took the Athlete's Oath at Barcelona in 1992. He is the brother of Manuel Doreste, Gustavo Doreste and José Doreste.

He skippered Desafío Español 2007 at the 2007 Louis Vuitton Cup.

References

External links
 

1961 births
Living people
2000 America's Cup sailors
2007 America's Cup sailors
Flying Dutchman class world champions
Medalists at the 1984 Summer Olympics
Medalists at the 1992 Summer Olympics
Oath takers at the Olympic Games
Olympic gold medalists for Spain
Olympic medalists in sailing
Olympic sailors of Spain
Real Club Náutico de Gran Canaria sailors
Sailors at the 1984 Summer Olympics – 470
Sailors at the 1988 Summer Olympics – Flying Dutchman
Sailors at the 1992 Summer Olympics – Flying Dutchman
Sailors at the 1996 Summer Olympics – Soling
Spanish male sailors (sport)
World champions in sailing for Spain
Soling class world champions
Sportspeople from Las Palmas
20th-century Spanish people